The Experts Network, also known as TXN and TXN Sports, is an interactive digital sports network consisting of sports analysts Cris Collinsworth, Boomer Esiason, Nick Faldo, Howie Long, Cal Ripken Jr. and Phil Simms.

TXN specializes in the development of digital and original programming, repurposed content, and high-end special events. TXN formulates strategic distribution partnerships with online sports networks and serves as the online "destination" sports property.

TXN Launch
The digital network launched on April 26, 2011. The presenters collaborate on digital and social media programming delivering their knowledge, opinions, and personal stories on topics in sports news and culture.

NFL Draft Preview Show
Most recently, Big Lead Sports, an independent digital sports company with more than 19 million users, partnered with TXNSPORTS.com to deliver NFL Draft content through an array of different channels.

On April 25, 2011 The Experts Network produced its first-ever sports show previewing the NFL Draft. The TXN NFL Draft Preview Show presented by Men's Wearhouse included exclusive draft breakdown by the top expert voices in NFL television. It was streamed and promoted exclusively on TXNSPORTS.com and across all of Big Lead Sports' digital platforms.

Behind the Mic
On October 1, 2010, TXN launched its first digital effort with Turner/SI.com and Allstate Insurance to produce Behind-The-Mic, a series of web-based vignettes providing analysis on news and issues in sports. The SI.com video series showcases the candid views, insights and expertise of some of the biggest names in sports broadcasting.

Each week Behind the Mic presented by Allstate features multiple 90-second video segments with the analysts offering their insights and opinions on topics impacting the sports they are most associated with, as well as responding to comments made by newsmakers that have resonated within their sport. Additional video segments are added during each sport’s respective postseasons and championships.

The collection of on-air personalities includes multiple Hall of Famers, MVPs, World Champions, All-Stars, Pro Bowlers and Emmy Award winners including Turner Sports roster of marquee on-air personalities. Featured Analysts for Behind the Mic presented by Allstate include:

Charles Barkley, 1993 NBA MVP & Basketball Hall of Famer (NBA)

Cris Collinsworth, 3-time Pro Bowler (NFL)

Boomer Esiason, 1988 NFL MVP & 4-time Pro Bowler (NFL)

Nick Faldo, 6-time Major Winner (Golf)

Doug Flutie, Heisman Trophy Winner (NCAA Football)

Howie Long, 8-time Pro Bowler & Pro Football Hall of Famer (NFL)

Kevin McHale, 7-time NBA All-Star & Basketball Hall of Famer

Reggie Miller, 5-time NBA All-Star

Cal Ripken, 19-time MLB All-Star & MLB Hall of Famer (MLB)

Phil Simms, 2-time Super Bowl Champion & Super Bowl XX MVP (NFL)

Kenny Smith, 2-time NBA Champion (NBA)

http://sportsillustrated.cnn.com/behindthemic/

The Experts
Cris Collinsworth is the Emmy Award-winning analyst and the lead analyst of NBC Sports Sunday Night Football and contributor to Showtime's Inside the NFL.

Boomer Esiason is an analyst for CBS Sports The NFL Today and the co-host of Boomer and Carton on WFAN NY.   He is also the lead analyst of Monday Night Football on Westwood One Radio Network.

Nick Faldo is the lead analyst of golf for CBS Sports and The Golf Channel.

Howie Long is a lead analyst for NFL on FOX pre-game show.

Cal Ripken Jr. is an analyst for MLB on Turner.

Phil Simms is the lead analyst for the NFL on CBS, and a contributor to INSIDE THE NFL on Showtime.

TXN plans to add new Experts to its already impressive line-up, as each professional sports season arrives, in order to provide a large array of content to supply the demand of sports fans everywhere.

References 

 Collinsworth, Esiason, Faldo, Long, Ripken And Simms to Launch TXNSPORTS.com
 SI.com, Turner Sports Launching Weekly Web Series
 NFL analysts talk up online-only 'Expert' venture
 Big Names, Big Platform Could Lead To Digital Success For TXNSports.com

External links
 TXN Sports
 Behind the Mic

American sport websites